Baume, de la Baume and Baumé are French surnames (not to be confused with the German surname Baum). Notable people of these surnames include the following:

 Count Aymar de la Baume Pluvinel (1860–1938), French astronomer
 Camille d'Hostun, duc de Tallard (1652–1728), otherwise Camille d'Hostun de la Baume, duc de Tallard, French diplomat and military commander
 Louise de la Vallière (1644–1710), otherwise Louise-Françoise de la Baume Le Blanc, duchesse de la Vallière, mistress of Louis XIV of France
 Pierre Baume, two individuals

 Antoine Baumé (1728–1804), French chemist
 Jérémy Baumont (1993-), otherwise La Baume, French rugby player and Pricing Manager at Corsair International

French-language surnames